Hyles livornica, the striped hawk-moth, is a moth of the family Sphingidae.

Taxonomy and systematics
Eugenius Johann Christoph Esper described the striped hawk-moth in 1780 using a specimen found in Italy at Livorno (hence the Latin name livornica). In 1819 Jacob Hübner allocated this species in his newly erected genus Hyles.

Until the 20th century Hyles livornica has been considered conspecific with the American Hyles lineata and is therefore under that name (or as Celerio lineata ssp. livornica) found in the older literature. Similar was the case with the Hyles livornicoides, which is prevalent in Australia. Hyles renneri from Nepal is sometimes treated as a valid species.

On the basis of DNA testing it is well established that H. livornica in its entire Afro-Palaearctic distribution forms a genetic and taxonomic unit. This results in the following relationships among the Palaearctic widespread species of the genus Hyles:

Distribution
This species is found in Africa, southern Europe, Poland, Australia, and central and east Asia.

Description
Hyles livornica has a wingspan reaching 60–80 mm. Males are slightly smaller than females. The forewings and the body are mainly olive brown or beige, with white stripes. The hindwings are pink, with black and white edges. The head and the thorax are olive-brown, with white stripes. The olive-brown abdomen has black-and-white segment, the first two segments have large black and white side spots. The antennae are dark olive brown and have a white tip.

These moths fly from February to October depending on the location. In Europe they are visible from April to June and from August to September in two generations and sometimes they overwinter. This species is a migrant from Africa to Europe. The caterpillars are green, with black markings and reach a length from 65 to 80 millimeters.

Biology
The caterpillars feed on various plants, mainly on Galium, Gossypium, Rumex, Vitis, Euphorbia, Linaria, Epilobium, Antirrhinum, Scabiosa, Linum, Fuchsia and Asphodelus.

Gallery

See also
 Lepidoptera migration
 Sphingidae

References

External links

Hyles livornica, Striped hawk-moth, UKMoths
Hyles livornica , Lepidoptera of Belgium
Hyles livornica, Lepiforum e.V.
Hyles livornica, Vlindernet.nl 

Hyles (moth)
Moths described in 1780
Moths of Africa
Moths of Cape Verde
Moths of Europe
Moths of Japan
Moths of Madagascar
Moths of the Middle East
Moths of Asia
Taxa named by Eugenius Johann Christoph Esper